Biscutella is a genus of about 46 species of flowering plants in the family Brassicaceae, according to Appel, O. & Al-Shehbaz, I.  2003.

It contains the following species:
 Biscutella laevigata
 Biscutella rotgesii

References

 
Brassicaceae genera
Taxonomy articles created by Polbot